A septum in cell biology is the new cell wall that forms between two daughter cells as a result of cell division.

In yeast, septins form a ring structure, to which other proteins are recruited. In particular, chitinase 2 is required, an enzyme that synthesises chitin thereby building up the primary septum. A secondary septum of β-glucans and mannoproteins is then assembled using the enzyme 1,3-Beta-glucan synthase, and the primary septum degraded during cell separation. After degradation of the primary septum, a chitinous bud scar remains on both the mother and daughter cell.

Composition 
In Schizosaccharomyces pombe, the primary septum is composed of linear β(1,3)-D-glucan, β(1,6) branches, and α(1,3)-D-glucan. The secondary septum in Schizosaccharomyces pombe is composed of β(1,6)-D-glucan, β(1,6) branches, and α(1,3)-D-glucan. The synthesis of linear β(1,3)-D-glucan for the primary septum is done by the enzyme β(1,3)-D-glucan synthase and regulated by a Rho GTPase. Ags1/Mok1 enzyme is responsible for the synthesis of α(1,3)-D-glucan in the primary septum and secondary septum.

References 

Organelles